Hiei or Hiyei may refer to:

 Mount Hiei, northeast of Kyoto, Japan
 , several warships of the Japanese Navy
 Hiei (YuYu Hakusho), a fictional character in the anime and manga series YuYu Hakusho

See also
 Hei (disambiguation)